Ray Watrin (born February 1, 1945) is a former professional Canadian football offensive lineman who played 12 seasons in the Canadian Football League for five different teams. He won the Leo Dandurand Trophy in 1979 and also was named CFL All-Star that season, and was a part of a Grey Cup championship team with the Montreal Alouettes in 1974 and 1977. Watrin played college football at Utah State University.

After retiring from professional football, Watrin returned to his home town of Okotoks, Alberta to coach football and teach math at Foothills Composite High School.  He also coached the Calgary Colts in the Canadian Junior Football League and coached in a Canadian Women's football league

In 2009, he retired from his post at Foothills Composite High School, and in 2010 he ran for Okotoks Town Council, he won by a slim margin.

References

1945 births
Living people
Players of Canadian football from Alberta
Canadian football offensive linemen
Utah State Aggies football players
Calgary Stampeders players
BC Lions players
Winnipeg Blue Bombers players
Montreal Alouettes players
Ottawa Rough Riders players
Alberta municipal councillors
Canadian sportsperson-politicians